Modhura Palit is an Indian cinematographer who works primarily in Bengali films. She studied cinematography from Satyajit Ray Film and Television Institute (SRFTI). She collaborated with well known directors like Arindam Sil, Rahool Mukherjee and Pathikrit Basu. She was awarded the Pierre Angénieux ExcelLens in Cinematography (Special Encouragement Award for promising cinematographer) at the 2019 Cannes Film Festival.

Filmography

References

External links 
 

Bengali film cinematographers
Living people
Cinematographers from West Bengal
Year of birth missing (living people)